The 1948–49 IHL season was the fourth season of the International Hockey League, a North American minor professional league. 11 teams participated in the regular season, and the Windsor Hettche Spitfires won the Turner Cup.

Regular season

Turner-Cup-Playoffs

External links
 Season 1948/49 on hockeydb.com

IHL
IHL
International Hockey League (1945–2001) seasons